Yeh Shaam Mastani is a reality musical show featuring seven singers. The show is hosted by Mini Mathur, who is known for her work as a host in Indian Idol television series. The show will air on the weekends on Sony Entertainment Television starting 3 May 2008.

Concept 
The show will have the country’s seven top singers who will regale audiences by singing their all-time favorites. Each episode will showcase the musical prowess of one artist who will perform live for the studio audience. These singers will take the stage to perform some of their greatest (solo or duet) hits and get up-close and personal with the viewers. Besides that the singers will also take requests for songs from their fans.

Host
Mini Mathur

Singers
Kailash Kher
Kunal Ganjawala
Rahat Fateh Ali Khan
Sukhwinder Singh
Shankar Mahadevan
Shaan
Sunidhi Chauhan

References

External links 
Official Site

Sony Entertainment Television original programming
Indian reality television series
Indian music television series
2008 Indian television series debuts
2008 Indian television series endings